Équateur province can mean:

 Équateur (former province), a former province of the Democratic Republic of the Congo
 Équateur District, a former district of pre-2015 second former Équateur Province in the Democratic Republic of the Congo.
 Province of Équateur, the current province of the Democratic Republic of the Congo
 Équateur (film), 1983 French drama film directed by Serge Gainsbourg

See also 
 Equator
 Equator (disambiguation)